Borja Jiménez Sáez (born 21 January 1985) is a Spanish football manager.

Coaching career
Born in Ávila, Castile and León, Jiménez started his career in 2006, with Real Ávila's youth setup. He left the club in 2009 and subsequently worked in the youth ranks at A.C. Milan Academy and Casa Social Católica, before returning to Ávila in 2011 as José Luis Diezma's assistant.

On 10 October 2013, Jiménez replaced sacked Kiko Sánchez as Ávila's first team manager. On 17 November 2014, after a run of poor results, he resigned.

Jiménez joined Real Valladolid in June 2015, as a manager of the Cadete A. On 22 October, however, he was appointed manager of the reserves in Segunda División B, and managed to avoid relegation with the side; on 30 May 2016, he announced his departure.

On 1 June 2016, Jiménez was named manager of CD Izarra still in the third division. On 10 July of the following year, after another mid-table finish, he was appointed at the helm of fellow league team Rápido de Bouzas.

After taking Rápido to an impressive fifth position, Jiménez was appointed manager of CD Mirandés on 28 June 2018, still in division three. He finished his first season in charge with a promotion to Segunda División through the play-offs.

On 5 July 2019, Jiménez left the Rojillos after the club failed to reach an agreement for the renewal of his contract, and he was appointed manager of Asteras Tripolis two days later. His first professional match in charge occurred on 24 August, a 0–1 loss at Olympiacos. He was relieved of his duties on 4 December 2019 despite winning 3–2 after extra time over Platanias in the second leg of the Greek Cup fifth round the same day.

Jiménez returned to his country's third division before the end of the year, taking the helm of FC Cartagena after Gustavo Munúa quit for Club Nacional de Football in his native Uruguay. In July 2020, he won them promotion to the second tier for the first time in eight years, with a penalty shootout play-off victory over CD Atlético Baleares.

Jiménez was sacked on 18 December 2020, after a Copa del Rey elimination to third division side Pontevedra CF. The following 26 May, he was named in charge of Primera División RFEF's Deportivo de La Coruña.

Managerial statistics

References

External links
 
 
 

1985 births
Living people
People from Ávila, Spain
Sportspeople from the Province of Ávila
Spanish football managers
Segunda División managers
Primera Federación managers
Segunda División B managers
CD Mirandés managers
FC Cartagena managers
Deportivo de La Coruña managers
Super League Greece managers
Asteras Tripolis F.C. managers
Spanish expatriate football managers
Spanish expatriate sportspeople in Greece
Expatriate football managers in Greece